MTV 90s  is a British pay television music channel owned by Paramount Networks UK & Australia that launched on 31 March 2022 replacing MTV Base. It was first launched as a temporary reband of MTV Classic from 27 May to 24 June 2016.

International version

In 2020, MTV 90s began broadcasting. The international version of the channel is registered with broadcasting regulators in Czech Republic.

Broadcasting

Satellite
Sky UK: Channel 352

Cable
Virgin Media: Channel 313

Temporary rebrands
MTV Pride: From 27 June to 4 July 2022. A first temporary rebrand of MTV 90s due to the closure of MTV Classic.
MTV Xmas: From 07 November to 27 December 2022.

Programmes
20 Songs from the Musicals!
90s Reggae Party: Top 20!
Artist: Brand New Vid!
Betty Boo
Artist! Just Because...
Will Smith
Artist: Official 90s Top 10
Janet Jackson
Artist Vs Artist!
Vengaboys Vs Aqua
Bon Jovi...in the 90s!
Britpop Battle! Artist vs Artist!
Oasis vs Blur
Classic R&b Of The 90s!
Clubbers Guide To The 90s! Top 100
Clubbers Guide To The 90s! Top 50
Easy Like A 90s Sunday Morning!
Every Number One of the 90s
Feel Good Friday! 100 Songs That Defined Your 90s!
Guitar Hits & Indie Anthems
Happy Birthday Artist!
Lisa Stansfield
Iconic 90s Videos That Made MTV
Movie Marathon: 100 Soundtrack Hits!
Non-Stop 90s Hits!
Now & Then
Official Rewind Chart
Pop Goes the 90s!
Remember These? 20 Tracks from 90s Ads!
Robbie Williams: Let The 90s Entertain Us!
Sing-Along Sunday! 100 No. 2s!
Sing-Along Sunday! 100 Songs That Defined Your 90s!
The 30 Greatest Songs Of Year
The 40 Greatest Girl Group Songs!
The 40 Greatest One Hit Wonders!
The Best 90s Saturday Night Party Ever
This Is How We Do a 90s Houseparty!
Ultimate 50 90s No 1s From The Boys
Ultimate 50 90s Sing-Along
Ultimate 50 R&B & Hip-Hop Hits Of The 90s
Whigfield's 90s Eurodance Top 20
Year: Every Official Number 1!
1991

MTV Pride
20 Steps of LGBT+ Anthems
50 Steps of LGBT+ Anthems
A Little Respect: 80s Pride Anthems
Adam Lambert's Fierce Pride Anthems!
Artist: Proud Ally!
Becky Hill
Charli XCX
Harry Styles
Kylie Minogue
Lady Gaga
Lizzo
Madonna
Artist: Pride Icon!
Boy George
Elton John
Freddie Mercury
George Michael 
Janelle Monae
Lil Nas X
Miley Cyrus
Sam Smith
Troye Sivan
Baga Chipz's Much Betta Hits
Born This Way: Pride Anthems of the 10s!
Gender Defiers Of The 80s!
Kim Petras' Wooh-Ah! Top 20
Let the Music Play!
Love is Love! Pride Icons
Munroe Bergdorf's Pride Mixtape
Olly Alexander's Prideography!
Out and Proud in the 80s!
Queerpiphany
Rupaul's Lip-Sync Extravaganza
Treat People With Kindness: Pride Anthems of the 20s!
Turn Up The Sass!
We Are Beautiful: 00s Pride Anthems!
Vogue: 90s Pride Anthems!

MTV Xmas
10s vs 20s: Christmas Hits!
100% Xmas Classics
50 Winter Favourites!
Artist at Christmas!
ABBA
Michael Buble
All I Want For Xmas Is... Mariah!
All The Jingle Ladies
Christmas Kamara Top 50!
Christmas Movie Classics!
Craig Revel Horwood's Xmas Fairy Tales!
Emma Bunton's Perfect Christmas
Gemma Collins Diva Xmas! Top 20
Gok Wan's Fabulous Christmas 50
Joey Essexmas 20
Let's Decorate The Tree Tunes!
Leona Lewis' Xmas With The Girls
Mariah Vs Buble: Christmas Royalty
Mel B's Spice Up Your Xmas 50
Official Christmas Streaming Top 40
Olly Murs Winter Wonderland Top 20
The Anton Du Beke Christmas Show: Top 50
The 30 Greatest Christmas Songs
The 40 Greatest Christmas Songs
The Christmas Cheeseboard
The Official Christmas Streaming Top 20
There's Nothing Like An '80s Xmas!
There's Nothing Like An '90s Xmas!
There's Nothing Like An '00s Xmas!
Winter Favourites!
Wish It Could Be Christmas Every Day!
Ultimate 20 Should've Been Xmas Number 1s
Ultimate 50 Christmas Crackers
Ultimate 50 Should've Been Xmas Number 1s
Ultimate Christmas Quiz

References

External links 
MTV 80s and MTV 90s will launch on 31 March
MTV 90s UK & Ireland - presentation, screenshots
REBRANDING MUSICAL CHANGES IN THE BRITISH PAY TV WITH MTV 80S AND MTV 90S (in Greek)

MTV channels
Music video networks in the United Kingdom
Television channels and stations established in 2022
2022 establishments in the United Kingdom